Dolichoderus moggridgei is a species of ant in the genus Dolichoderus. Described by Forel in 1886, the species is endemic to Afghanistan, China and India.

References

Dolichoderus
Hymenoptera of Asia
Insects of Afghanistan
Insects of China
Insects of India
Insects described in 1886